The "8th" annual (void) Venice International Film Festival was held from September 1 to September 8, 1940, less than three months after Italy had belatedly entered the Second World War as Germany's ally. The events were held in places far away from the Lido, and very few countries participated due to World War II  and directors that were members of the Rome–Berlin axis.  In fact the Festival lost its ‘international’ designation that year, as the war had reduced the number of participating nations to just three: Italy, Germany and, in a sparring role, Hungary. It became therefore the "Manifestazione cinematografica italo-tedesca", to reflect its Italo-German character. The two countries participated with seven feature films each, while Hungary had three. 
Additionally, a strong fascist political meddling from the Italian fascist government under Benito Mussolini had led to Italy experiencing a period of cultural depression oppressed by fascist propaganda.

Jury
Although the festival is still competitive it takes place without an official jury. Awards are given by the festival's president based on the decision of Italian and German film delegates.

In Competition

Awards
Mussolini Cup
 Best Foreign Film -  Der Postmeister (Gustav Ucicky)
 Best Italian Film -  The Siege of the Alcazar (Augusto Genina)
Volpi Cup
Best Actor - 
Best Actress -

References

External links
 
Venice Film Festival 1940 Awards on IMDb

8th Venice International Film Festival
8th Venice International Film Festival
Venice Film Festival
 
8th Venice International Film Festival